Nikki Patel (born 5 July 1990) is an English actress. She is known for portraying the role of Amber Kalirai in the ITV soap opera Coronation Street from 2005 to 2009, then again from 2011 to 2012.

Career
Patel joined the cast of Coronation Street in late 2005, playing Dev's teenage daughter Amber Kalirai. After four years, she left the show to pursue other acting roles and to go to university. In 2011, she returned to Coronation Street and left the show again in March 2012. In 2006, Patel appeared in an episode of the BBC drama Waterloo Road. She played a character called Shazia Patel. One week after landing the role, she was nominated as Best Newcomer at the National Television Awards. In May 2022, she appeared in an episode of the BBC soap opera Doctors as Shelley Anwar.

Credits

References

External links

20th-century English actresses
21st-century English actresses
Actresses from Yorkshire
British actresses of Indian descent
English actresses of South Asian descent
English child actresses
English people of Indian descent
English soap opera actresses
English television actresses
Living people
Actresses from Bradford
1990 births